The 1999 Summer Universiade, also known as the XX Summer Universiade, took place in Palma de Mallorca, Spain.

Venues
 Estadi Son Moix — athletics, football, ceremonies
 Arena Son Moix — volleyball
 Pavelló Son Hugo — swimming, diving, water polo
 Palma Arena — gymnastics, tennis
 Arena Sant Josep Obrer — volleyball, basketball
 Galatzo Arena — volleyball, basketball
 La salle Pont d'Inca — volleyball, basketball
 Pont d'Inca — water polo, sailing

Sports
 Athletics
 Basketball
 Diving
 Fencing
 Football
 Gymnastics
 Judo
 Sailing
 Swimming
 Tennis
 Volleyball
 Water polo

Medal table

External links
 Official website of the 20th Summer Universiade

 
1999
U
U
U
Multi-sport events in Spain
Sport in Palma de Mallorca
July 1999 sports events in Europe